The 1977–78 Buffalo Sabres season was the Sabres' eighth season of operation for the National Hockey League franchise that was established on May 22, 1970.

Offseason

Regular season

Final standings

Schedule and results

Playoffs

Preliminary Round vs. New York Rangers

Quarterfinals vs. Philadelphia Flyers

Player statistics

Awards and records

Transactions

Draft picks
Buffalo's draft picks at the 1977 NHL amateur draft held at the Mount Royal Hotel in Montreal, Quebec.

Farm teams

See also
1977–78 NHL season

References

Buffalo Sabres seasons
Buffalo
Buffalo
National Hockey League All-Star Game hosts
Buffalo
Buffalo